is a 2015 Japanese biographical drama film directed by Cellin Gluck. It depicts the life of Japanese diplomat Chiune Sugihara who was appointed a vice-consul and later a consul in Lithuania and served there from 1939 to 1940 and who saved lives of some 6,000 Jewish refugees by issuing transit visas to the Japanese Empire.

Even though most of the film is set in Interwar Lithuania, various places in Poland were chosen for filming. The Polish cargo ship SS Sołdek also appeared in the movie.

Plot 
Chiune Sugihara is a Japanese diplomat working in Lithuania. During World War II, with the help of Dutch diplomat Jan Zwartendijk, he attempts to save many Jews from Nazi Germany by issuing transit visas to Japan. The film depicts Sugihara's life from the period when he was a student in Waseda University.

Cast 
Toshiaki Karasawa – Chiune Sugihara
Koyuki – Yukiko Sugihara (Chiune's wife)
Borys Szyc – Pesh (ペシュ Pesshu)
Agnieszka Grochowska – Irina (イリーナ Irīna)
Fumiyo Kohinata – Ambassador Oshima
 – Wolfgang Gudze (グッジェ Gujje)
Michał Żurawski – Nyiszli (ニシェリ Nisheri)
Zbigniew Zamachowski – Avraham Goehner (ガノール社長 Ganōru-shachō)
Andrzej Blumenfeld – Chaim Rosenthal
Takashi Tsukamoto – Minamikawa (南川欽吾)
Gaku Hamada - Tatsuo Osako (大迫辰雄 Ōsako Tetsuo)
Wenanty Nosul – Jan Zwartendijk
Ken'ichi Takito - Ichiro Sekimitsu (関満一朗 Sekimitsu Ichirō)
Satoshi Nikaido - Saburo Nei (根井三郎 Nei Saburō)

Production 

Cellin Gluck – Director

Release 

As a premiere in Poland, it was  an opening film at the Warsaw Jewish Film Festival

The North American premiere was part of the 2016 Atlanta Jewish Film Festival (AJFF) with five screenings, one each at five of the festival venues.   The first screening was 31 January 2016 at SCADshow.

Reception 
The film grossed  on its opening weekend in Japan.

References

External links

 
 

2015 films
2010s Japanese-language films
Japanese biographical drama films
2015 biographical drama films
Holocaust films
Films about refugees
World War II films based on actual events
Nippon TV films
Films set in Lithuania
Films shot in Poland
Toho films
Japanese historical drama films
2010s historical drama films
Sugihara's Jews
2015 drama films
2010s Japanese films
Films produced by Kazutoshi Wadakura
Films about diplomats